Bob Standing (21 January 1928 – 27 February 2008) was a South African sailor. He competed in the Flying Dutchman event at the 1960 Summer Olympics.

References

External links
 

1928 births
2008 deaths
South African male sailors (sport)
Olympic sailors of South Africa
Sailors at the 1960 Summer Olympics – Flying Dutchman
Sportspeople from Durban